House by the Cemetery is an EP by Mortician. The album is named after cult director Lucio Fulci's 1981 horror film The House by the Cemetery. The album features samples from various horror movies.

Track listing

Original release
Originally, Relapse Records released House by the Cemetery only as a 7" EP on September 16, 1994. It was pressed on black vinyl, but there was a limited pressing (200 copies) on silver vinyl. The vinyl version contained the following tracks:

House by the Cemetery was later released as a CD, which contains the track listing stated below.

CD release

The title for track 3, "World Domination", is a misprint on the CD's back cover, as the title listed in the lyric sheet is "World Damnation". This becomes more evident with the final line in the lyrics — "Damnation of the earth".

Later release

Now out-of-print, House by the Cemetery has been re-released as a two-for-one package. This newer edition includes the tracks found on the House by the Cemetery CD, as well as the tracks found on the Mortal Massacre CD.

Mortician (band) albums
Albums with cover art by Wes Benscoter
1995 EPs